Men at Arms is a fantasy novel by British writer Terry Pratchett, the 15th book in the Discworld series, first published in 1993. It is the second novel about the Ankh-Morpork City Watch on the Discworld. Lance-constable Angua von Überwald, later in the series promoted to the rank of Sergeant, is introduced in this book. Lance-constable (in the course of the novel promoted to Acting-constable) Detritus is introduced as a new member of the watch as well, though he had already appeared in other Discworld novels, most notably in Moving Pictures. Also notable is the only appearance of Lance-constable Cuddy (also promoted to Acting-constable).

Plot

Edward d'Eath, an Assassin and son of a down-and-out noble family, becomes convinced that the restoration of the Ankh-Morpork monarchy will solve the social change in the city which he blames for his family's humbling.  He researches the history of the royal family and determines that Carrot Ironfoundersson is in fact the rightful heir to the throne.

Meanwhile, Captain Samuel Vimes, captain of the Ankh-Morpork City Watch, prepares for his imminent wedding to Sybil Ramkin, the richest woman in Ankh-Morpork. He also must deal with a new group of recruits that he has been required to take on for the sake of diversity: Cuddy (a dwarf), Detritus (a troll), and Angua (a werewolf—but Carrot is unaware of this, and believes she is included because she is female).  When a string of seemingly random murders occur among the Guilds of the city, Lord Vetinari forbids Vimes to investigate in a successful ploy to ensure Vimes does investigate. Cuddy and Detritus are forced to work together, resulting in them becoming friends as they overcome their deep-seated racial enmity. Angua works with the talking dog Gaspode, and also forms a romantic connection with Carrot, who loses his virginity to her but handles the discovery that she is a werewolf poorly.

It is revealed that d'Eath has stolen the gonne, the Disc's first and only handheld firearm, from the Assassins' Guild, with the intention of discrediting Vetinari's government through the murders. Any possessor of the gonne seems to become obsessed with the device. After d'Eath reveals his plan to Dr. Cruces, head of the Assassin's Guild, Cruces murders him and takes up the plan himself. The Watch prevent Cruces from killing Vetinari, but Cuddy and Angua are killed in the process.  Vimes and Carrot confront and disarm Cruces, and Carrot helps Vimes resist the gonne's allure.  Cruces gives Carrot the evidence that he is the royal heir, upon which Carrot kills Cruces with his sword and has both the evidence and the dismantled gonne buried with Cuddy. As a werewolf can only be killed with a silver weapon, Angua is revived upon the moon's rising.

Vimes and Ramkin are married. Recent events have raised the Night Watch's profile, bringing a slew of new recruits. Carrot visits Vetinari, who is expecting Carrot to make personal demands as he is now in a strong position to blackmail the Patrician. What Carrot actually brings is a request for Vetinari to implement a plan for reforming the City Watch into an effective, integrated, comprehensive police force with better working conditions. Vetinari accedes, making Carrot Captain of the Watch and elevating Vimes to the recreated position Commander of the Watch, and the rank of Knight.

Characters

Angua
Fred Colon
Cuddy
Detritus
Carrot Ironfoundersson
Nobby
Lord Vetinari
Samuel Vimes

Reception
Publishers Weekly considered it to not be "as consistently funny as [Pratchett's] earlier novels", but noted that "the dialogue is hilarious", and opined that although it lacked "rational narrative cause-and-effect", this "didn't matter"; similarly, Kirkus Reviews found it to be "an about average installment" of an "always entertaining, sometimes hysterically funny series."

Brandon Sanderson has described it as "funny in a clever, scholarly, satire sort of way", with "excellent pacing" and "irresistible" characters.

References

External links

 
 Annotations for Men at Arms
 Quotes from Men at Arms

1993 British novels
Discworld books
1993 fantasy novels
Victor Gollancz Ltd books
British comedy novels